Frank Deli (October 10, 1886 – 1946) was a Chicago businessman. 

Deli was born in the Austro-Hungarian Empire and emigrated to the United States in 1903. 

In the early 1920s, Deli helped found the Autopoint Company. He helped pioneer the use of plastics to make pencils. Apparently, Deli did not sell his share when the Bakelite Corporation took control of Autopoint. He worked for Autopoint until his death in 1946. At the time of this death he was also a member of the board of directors.

Deli obtained many patents related to pencils and the manufacture of pencils.

External links
  Autobiography of Frank Deli
  Resume of Frank C. Deli, 1933

1886 births
1946 deaths
Austro-Hungarian emigrants to the United States